Umpqua dace (Rhinichthys evermanni) is a species of ray-finned fish in the genus Rhinichthys. It is endemic to the United States where it inhabits the Umpqua River drainage in Oregon.

References 

Rhinichthys
Fish described in 1908